James Beaumont (born 11 November 1984) is an English former professional footballer who played in midfield. Beaumont joined Nottingham Forest from Newcastle United in 2003.

References

External links

1984 births
Living people
Footballers from Stockton-on-Tees
Footballers from County Durham
English footballers
Newcastle United F.C. players
Nottingham Forest F.C. players
Darlington F.C. players
Northwich Victoria F.C. players
English Football League players
Alumni of Staffordshire University
Footballers from Yorkshire
Association football midfielders